Mack Bernard Rhoades IV is American college athletics administrator.  He is the athletic director at Baylor University, a position he has held since July 2016.  Rhoades was previously the athletic director at the University of Akron from 2006 to 2009, the University of Houston from 2009 to 2015, and the University of Missouri from 2015 to 2016. Rhoades was hired at Akron in December 2005 after former Zips athletic director Mike Thomas took the same position at the University of Cincinnati. Prior to his arrival at Akron, he had worked in the athletics department at University of Texas at El Paso (UTEP) since 1998.

See also
 List of NCAA Division I athletic directors

References

External links
 Baylor profile

1965 births
Living people
Akron Zips athletic directors
Baylor Bears athletic directors
Houston Cougars athletic directors
Indiana University alumni
Marquette University people
Missouri Tigers athletic directors
University of Arizona alumni
University of Texas at El Paso people
Yale University staff
Sportspeople from Tucson, Arizona